Ballymacarrett railway station (also known as Ballymacarrett halt) was a railway halt that served the townland of Ballymacarrett in east Belfast.

History

Following the closure of the  terminus in 1976, and the reconnection of the Bangor Line to the Newry Line via , Ballymacarrett station was closed on 9 May 1977 and replaced by the nearby Bridge End station, which was renamed "" in 2012.

Service

References

Disused railway stations in County Down
Disused railway stations in Belfast
Railway stations opened in 1905
Railway stations closed in 1977
1905 establishments in Ireland
1977 disestablishments in Northern Ireland
Railway stations in Northern Ireland opened in the 20th century